Kane Brewing is a craft brewery in Ocean Township, Monmouth County, New Jersey. It was started in 2011. It is New Jersey's third-largest craft brewery, after Flying Fish Brewery and River Horse Brewery.

History
Kane Brewing was founded by Michael Kane. He started homebrewing at age 22 in order to recreate a German/Belgian style beer he tasted while on a trip in College. After he won gold and silver medals at the 2009 National Homebrew Competition, he took his hobby more seriously and researched opening a brewery. He took a job at a Wall Street mergers and acquisitions firm, but after four years, he quit to open his own brewery in 2011 in a former casket shop. The following year, New Jersey beer laws were harmonized with those of surrounding states, allowing production limits to increase and giving Kane an opportunity to grow quickly into one of New jersey's biggest breweries.

See also
Alcohol laws of New Jersey
Beer in New Jersey
Beer in the United States
List of wineries, breweries, and distilleries in New Jersey

References

Tourist attractions in Mercer County, New Jersey
2011 establishments in New Jersey
Beer brewing companies based in New Jersey
Ocean Township, Ocean County, New Jersey